Zeluroides is a genus of assassin bugs in the family Reduviidae. There are at least two described species in Zeluroides.

Species
These two species belong to the genus Zeluroides:
 Zeluroides americanus Lent & Wygodzinsky, 1948
 Zeluroides mexicanus Lent & Wygodzinsky, 1948

References

Further reading

 
 
 

Reduviidae
Articles created by Qbugbot